Enallagma maldivensis is a species of damselfly in family Coenagrionidae. It is endemic to Maldives.

References

Coenagrionidae
Endemic fauna of the Maldives
Insects described in 1902
Taxonomy articles created by Polbot
Taxobox binomials not recognized by IUCN